Marc Antony and Pussyfoot are animated characters in four Warner Bros. Looney Tunes and Merrie Melodies shorts. Three cartoons focus on the dog and kitten pair: Feed the Kitty (1952), Kiss Me Cat (1953) and Cat Feud (1958). They also appear in one Claude Cat cartoon, Feline Frame-Up (1954).

Description
Marc Antony is a burly bulldog that is usually brown with a tan belly and black ears, though his coloration varies in some shorts. He bears a close resemblance to Hector the Bulldog, but with thinner back legs and minus the outer fangs. Pussyfoot/Cleo, in contrast, is a petite and extremely cute, blue-eyed black-and-white tuxedo cat to whom Marc Antony is utterly devoted with motherly passion. The characters seem to be named as an allusion to Mark Antony and Cleopatra, who were lovers detailed in Plutarch's Parallel Lives. Chuck Jones, the creator, has discussed the efforts to maximize the kitten's sheer adorableness. All head and eyes, she is black with a white face and belly and a white tip on her fluffy tail.

Influence
Pussyfoot has appeared in some Warner Bros. merchandising, and the pair have been featured in various Warner Bros. productions, such as the third segment of the film version of Twilight Zone: The Movie (1983), and a Looney Tunes comic book story called "Bringing Up Baby" published in 1999. Tiny Toon Adventures featured a similar character named Barky Marky, who was a comparatively minor character on the show. The pair were also an inspiration for the characters Buttons and Mindy that were featured in the successor to Tiny Toon Adventures, Animaniacs.  In the Buttons and Mindy short "Cat on a Hot Steel Beam", the cat that Mindy follows throughout the cartoon is Pussyfoot. Additionally, the kitten makes a very brief cameo appearance in the Chuck Jones short Another Froggy Evening (1995). 

Jones would later revisit the idea of a cute kitten having an unlikely protector in an MGM Tom and Jerry short, The Unshrinkable Jerry Mouse (1964), with Jerry becoming a kitten's friend and protector against a selfish and jealous Tom (the plot of which was borrowed from Feline Frame-Up (1954)). In Feline Frame-Up, Claude Cat attempts to convince their human owner that Marc Antony wants to harm Pussyfoot.

A segment of Feed the Kitty, in which an apparently "inconsolable" Marc Antony believes that Pussyfoot has been turned into a cookie (and unaware that the kitten is actually perfectly safe), was the subject of a homage in the 2001 Pixar film Monsters, Inc. in which Sulley believes that a little human girl he is protecting has fallen into a trash compactor, and reenacts the scene with Marc Antony nearly shot-for-shot.

A reference is also made to Feed the Kitty in the 13th and 14th episodes of season 14 of South Park with Eric Cartman acting as Pussyfoot and Cthulhu as Marc Antony in his "cute kitten" routine.

In the series Archer, the relationship between Archer and his daughter A.J. was inspired by their cartoons, according to series creator Adam Reed.

Feed the Kitty is available on DVD, appearing on the compilations Looney Tunes Golden Collection Volume 1, disc 3 and Looney Tunes Spotlight Collection, and on Blu-ray, on Looney Tunes Platinum Collection: Volume 1.

Alternate names
Marc Antony is referred to as "Marc Anthony" on his food dish in Feed the Kitty and therefore his name should be spelled "Marc Anthony" throughout this article. Pussyfoot is sometimes called "Kitty" or "Cleo" in some WB animation history books.

Appearances

Classic shorts
Cheese Chasers (1951, Marc Antony only, unnamed)
 Feed the Kitty (1952) 
 Kiss Me Cat (1953)
 Feline Frame-Up (1954)
 Cat Feud (1958)

Marc Antony also makes a cameo appearance in No Barking (1954), and Pussyfoot makes one in Another Froggy Evening (1995).

Other media
 Animaniacs episode 14, "Cat on a Hot Steel Beam" (Pussyfoot only)
 Who Framed Roger Rabbit (Marc Antony cameo only, colored gray)
 Space Jam (as two of the background characters)
 Looney Tunes: Back in Action (cameos at the end)
 Tweety's High-Flying Adventure (Pussyfoot only)
 Toon Marooned episode 10, "Fowl By Comin' Round the Mountain" (Marc Antony cameo)
 Parallel Porked (Marc Antony cameo)
 New Looney Tunes
 Looney Tunes Cartoons 
 The Bugs Bunny Crazy Castle 2
 Bugs Bunny Crazy Castle 3
 Bugs Bunny Builders
All about Marc Antony on Chuck Jones Official Website.

References

Pussyfoot
Marc Antony
Looney Tunes characters
Film characters introduced in 1951
Animated duos
Warner Bros. cartoon characters